Order of Brilliant Star is a civilian order of the Republic of China (Taiwan) recognizing outstanding contributions to the development of the nation. The order is instituted in 1941 and can be awarded to both domestic and foreign nationals.

Order medal and ranks

The centre of the medal is a five-pointed star in token of virtue.  The name 'Brilliant Star' came from the ancient book of Records of the Grand Historian which says "The Brilliant Stars, which differs in appearance from time to time, shine upon the nations of the righteous."

There are nine ranks within the order according to the Article of Decorations of the Republic of China. First rank should be awarded by the President of Republic of China.

Classes

Recipients

First Rank

Nationals

Foreign Nationals

Second Rank

Nationals

Foreign Nationals

Reference list

Orders, decorations, and medals of the Republic of China
Awards established in 1941
1941 establishments in China